Sakaria Zaa Nashandi (born 8 July 1949 in Onayena) is a Namibian politician, businessman and an ex-Robben Island political prisoner. He is a recognised National Hero of Namibia for his contributions to the independence of the country.

Nashandi attended school in Onayena and was actively involved in the Ovamboland People's Congress, the predecessor of SWAPO.

He owns several small businesses in and around Onayena. Nashandi married Kauna Nashandi, a former mayor of Ondangwa, who died in Windhoek in  2013.

References

1949 births
Inmates of Robben Island
People's Liberation Army of Namibia personnel
Colonial people in German South West Africa
Namibian people imprisoned abroad
Living people
Members of the National Assembly (Namibia)
People from Oshikoto Region
SWAPO politicians
Namibian revolutionaries
South West African anti-apartheid activists